Neptune Small (September 15, 1831 - August 10, 1907) was a slave of the Thomas Butler King family at Retreat Plantation, St. Simons Island, Georgia.  He accompanied Captain Henry Lord Page King during the Civil War until King's death in battle on December 13, 1862, during the battle of Fredericksburg, Virginia.  He later accompanied R. Cuyler "Tip" King until the end of the Civil War.  Neptune Park on St. Simons Island is named after Small.

References 

19th-century American slaves
American freedmen
1831 births
1907 deaths
19th-century African-American people
20th-century African-American people